Ilan Moskovitch (born August 3, 1966), is an Israeli filmmaker, producer, director, casting director and acting instructor.

Biography
Ilan Moskovitch was born and raised in Acre, Israel, second generation to immigrants from Romania,  survivors of the Holocaust. His father Meir owned a kiosk in ancient Acre, near the Arabic cinema "Bustan", and  his mother Anna worked as a hospital nurse. Moskovitch is a graduate of the cinema department of "Camera Obscura – School of Art" (1992). In the year after his graduation, he worked as a  production coordinator and manager for different various TV projects, working   with the directors Dan Wolman, Ze'ev Revach and others.
In 1995 he met the international Israeli director Amos Gitai. Moskovitch worked  as his personal assistant in the movie "Dvarim", and since then the two cooperated in more than twenty movies,   many of which were feature films for cinema, including  "Free Zone", "Promised Land", "Alila", "Carmel", "Kadosh", "Disengagement",   "Kippur", "Eden", "Kedma", "Yom Yom" and "Ana Arabia", in which Moskovitch served as the casting director.
Four of those films: "Kadosh (1999), "Kippur" (2000), Kedma" (2002) and "Free Zone" (2005), participated in the Official Competition of the Cannes Film Festival (in which Moskovitch was the artistic consultant and the casting director). Moskovitch was the casting director in the film "Free Zone"   in which Hana Laszlo won the Best Actress Prize in 2005 at the Cannes Film Festival, for her role in the film.
Moskovitch produced documentary films with Gitai, among them "Tapuz", "The Arena of Murder", "Golan Diary", "Milim" and a video installation entitled "The Public Residence of The Fifties", which was shown at the Ein Harod Museum of Art and at the Herzliya Museum of Contemporary Art.

Besides his work with Amos Gitai, he established in 1997 the production company "Cinemax" along with director David Noy; he produced the films "Peach", "What Now?", and "Arlekino Behind The Masks". In 2001 he produced commercials and communication videos with the journalist David Gilboa, for the Israeli Ministry of Environmental Protection, United Jewish Appeal, Shahal, Bank Hapoalim and Ford Motor Company.
In 2003, he established "Impro" – Acting Studio for Cinema and TV with his partner, theater director Avi Malka. In 2008 he produced the feature film "Who kidnapped Moshe Ivgy?", directed by Avi Malka. This is the first full-length feature film produced by an acting school in Israel, in which all the major and lead roles were acted by third year  graduates.
In 2009 he produced the documentary film "The Ambassadors", directed by Tal Agassi for Israel Channel 8.
Together with Eran Paz he produced the documentary film "Jeremiah", directed by Eran Paz. The movie won the Best Director Prize Award for Documentary Film in the Jerusalem Film Festival 2010.

In 2013, together with Dan Bronfeld, Moskovitch directed and produced for Channel 8  a documentary film entitled "Appolonian Story". The film is  about a man who built his home in a cave and lived there for a period of forty years. The film participated in film festivals around the world, including, AFI Docs, Full Frame Documentary Film Festival, Jerusalem Film Festival, Guangzhou International Documentary Film Festival, and Thessaloniki International Film Festival.
As a producer he is currently  working on a film entitled "Holy Air", with director Shadi Srour. The script of "Holy Air" participated at the L'Atelier 2013 Cannes Film Festival.
In 2015 he cast Amos Gitai's latest feature film entitled "Rabin, the Last Day", about the circumstances leading to the assassination of Israeli's Prime Minister, Yitzhak Rabin, twenty years ago. The film participated at the Venice Film Festival - Official Competition 2015 as well as the Toronto International Film Festival, 2015.

Moskovitch has worked with well-known Israeli film actors, among them: Moni Moshonov,Yael Abecassis,Hana Laszlo,Moshe Ivgy, Hanna Maron, Keren Mor, Yussuf Abu-Warda, Juliano Mer-Khamis,Ronit Elkabetz, Assi Dayan, Lea Koenig, Samuel Calderon, Liron Levo, Uri Klauzner,Amos Lavi.

Moskovitch has also worked with international film actors such as: Jeanne Moreau, Juliette Binoche,Natalie Portman, Carmen Maura (Almodovar Films),Samantha Morton,Anne Parillaud (La Femme Nikita), Hanna Schygulla,  Rosamund Pike.

Filmography

References

External links

 Moskovitch Official site
 "Apollonian Story" official site

Moscovitch in Cinemotions
 (June 10, 2014). "Questions and answers with Ilan Moskovitch". American Film Institute.
About the movie "Apollonian Story":
 "Apollonian Story" at the AFI Docs
 "Apollonian Story" at the Thessaloniki International Film Festival.
 Doyle, Ronan (April 2, 2014). "Full Frame: Apollonian Story Review"  at the Next Projection.

1966 births
Israeli Jews
Israeli film producers
Israeli film directors
Casting directors
Living people